Mythimna speciosa is a moth in the family Noctuidae. It is found in India.

The length of the forewings is about 16.4 mm. The forewings are brownish yellow. The hindwings are fuscous on the outer half and the basal area is slightly whitish.

References

Moths described in 1991
Mythimna (moth)
Moths of Asia